Afanasyevka is a rural locality (a selo) and the administrative center of Afanasyevskoye Rural Settlement, Alexeyevsky District, Belgorod Oblast, Russia. The population was 1,265 as of 2010, making it a small town. There are 9 streets.

Geography 
Afanasyevka is located 21 km northwest of Alexeyevka (the district's administrative centre) by road. Kamyzino is the nearest rural locality.

References 

Rural localities in Alexeyevsky District, Belgorod Oblast